Jesse Debrah (born 1 May 2001) is an English footballer who plays as a defender for Halifax.

Career

Debrah started his career with English second tier side Millwall. In 2019, he was sent on loan to Dulwich Hamlet in the English sixth tier. In 2021, Debrah signed for English fifth tier club Halifax. After that, he received interest from Huddersfield in the English second tier.

References

External links

 

2001 births
Association football defenders
Billericay Town F.C. players
Dulwich Hamlet F.C. players
Eastbourne Borough F.C. players
English footballers
FC Halifax Town players
Living people
Millwall F.C. players
National League (English football) players